Djamila Rakhmatova (Russian: Джамиля Рахматова; born 19 September 1990) is a retired individual Uzbekistani rhythmic gymnast.

Career 
A member of the Uzbek National gymnastics team since 2002, Rakhmatova has competed in 5 World Championships, she had her highest placement at the 2013 World Championships in Kyiv, Ukraine finishing 18th in the All-around.

She and the Uzbek Team won Team silver medal at the 2010 Asian Games. She won silver in the All-around at the 2013 Asian Championships. She finished 10th in all-around at the 2013 Grand Prix Final in Berlin and won silver medal in ribbon final.

In 2014 season, Rakhmatova competed at the 2014 Stuttgart World Cup and finished 15th in the all-around. She then competed at the 2014 Lisboa World Cup where he finished 10th in the all-around. On May 9–11, Rakhmatova competed at the 2014 Corbeil-Essonnes World Cup and finished 17th in all-around. On May 22–24, Rakhmatova competed at the 2014 Tashkent World Cup where she finished 9th in all-around behind teammate Elizaveta Nazarenkova. Rakhmatova then competed at the 2014 Minsk World Cup where she finished 8th in all-around behind Marina Durunda, she qualified to 1 event final finishing 5th place in ribbon. On August 8–10, Rakhmatova competed at the 2014 Sofia World Cup finishing 12th in all-around and qualified to event final in ribbon finishing 8th behind teammate Elizaveta Nazarenkova. On September 5–7, at the 2014 World Cup Final in Kazan, Rakhmatova competed and finished 10th in all-around. At the 2014 World Championships, Rakhmatova finished 21st in all-around finals and Team Uzbekistan taking 8th place. She then competed at the 2014 Asian Games in Incheon, Korea where she finished 4th in all-around behind compatriot Anastasiya Serdyukova. She completed her career in 2015.

Routine music information

References

External links
 

1990 births
Living people
Uzbekistani rhythmic gymnasts
Sportspeople from Tashkent
Asian Games medalists in gymnastics
Gymnasts at the 2006 Asian Games
Gymnasts at the 2010 Asian Games
Gymnasts at the 2014 Asian Games
Asian Games gold medalists for Uzbekistan
Asian Games silver medalists for Uzbekistan
Medalists at the 2010 Asian Games
Medalists at the 2014 Asian Games